Spencer Treat Clark (born September 24, 1987) is an American actor. He rose to prominence for his roles in the films Gladiator (2000) and Unbreakable (2000). He has since appeared in the films Mystic River (2003), The Last House on the Left (2009), Much Ado About Nothing (2012) and Glass (2019).

Clark is also known for his roles in the television series Agents of S.H.I.E.L.D. (2015–2018), where he portrayed Werner von Strucker throughout the third and fifth seasons, and Animal Kingdom (2016–2019).

Early life
Clark was born in New York City. He is the brother of screenwriter and playwright Eliza Clark. He was educated in Darien, Connecticut, at Hindley Elementary School, Middlesex Middle School and Darien High School before he attended and graduated from the Taft School in Watertown, Connecticut. Clark graduated from Columbia University in New York City, receiving bachelor's degrees in political science and economics.

Career
Clark began his career in 1995, appearing on the television show Another World. His film debut was in Arlington Road.

He appeared in the series finale of Mad Men and in the 2014 film Cymbeline. , Clark has a recurring role on the television series Animal Kingdom.

On August 30, 2021, it was announced that Clark will appear as Mike Ryerson in an adaptation of Stephen King's Salem's Lot for Warner Bros. Pictures and New Line Cinema.

Filmography

Film

Television

References

External links 

1987 births
Taft School alumni
20th-century American male actors
21st-century American male actors
American male child actors
American male film actors
American male television actors
Columbia College (New York) alumni
Living people
Male actors from New York City